Sheran is a surname. Notable people with the surname include:

 John Sheran (born 1960), Scottish footballer and manager
 Kathy Sheran (born 1947), American politician
 Nicholas Sheran (1841–1882), American businessman
 Robert Sheran (1916–2012), American lawyer, politician, and judge

See also
 Sheeran